Yuri Zisser (June 28, 1960 – May 17, 2020) was a Belarusian programmer and entrepreneur, known as a founder and owner of TUT.by, the most visited Belarusian web portal.

Biography
Yuri Zisser was born in a Jewish family in Lviv, Ukraine and graduated from the North Western Polytechnic Institute in Leningrad. In 1987 he moved to Minsk, Belarus. In 1992 he established the company Nadezhnye programmy.

He has been one of the most frequent members of the jury of the social projects competition SocialWeekend.

He was author of several books on Internet marketing and software marketing.

He died due to stomach cancer complications.

References

1960 births
2020 deaths
Belarusian businesspeople
21st-century Belarusian Jews
Ukrainian Jews
Naturalized citizens of Belarus
Businesspeople from Lviv
Ukrainian emigrants to Belarus
20th-century businesspeople
21st-century businesspeople
Deaths from stomach cancer